Sally Wheeler Maier (born May 19, 1970) is an American stage and television actress. She is known for playing the role of "Carrie Moore" in the American sitcom television series Two of a Kind.

Life and career 
Wheeler was born in Winter Haven, Florida, the daughter of Irving, a lawyer, and Carolyn Wheeler, a singer, and has three brothers. She first acted on stage at age nine. She graduated from Winter Haven High School, and later attended Queens University of Charlotte, North Carolina. She  also attended the University of Florida at Gainesville, where she earned a master's degree in drama and English, as well as earning a doctorate from Florida State University at Tallahassee.

Wheeler began her career in New York, appearing in three commercials, an Off-Broadway play, and a play titled Gypsy. In 1998, Wheeler appeared in a new ABC sitcom Two of a Kind, playing the role of "Carrie Moore", a college student who was the babysitter of Mary-Kate and Ashley (Mary-Kate Olsen and Ashley Olsen).

After the series ended, Wheeler guest-starred in the television series Spin City. She appeared in three soap operas, such as, Another World, As the World Turns (as "Wendy") and Guiding Light. Wheeler also appeared on stage in Detective Story and Fiddler on the Roof, and As You Like It. She performed at the Worth Street Theater Company, where she co-starred in the play In the Forest of Arden, playing the role of "Rosalind". In 2008, Wheeler appeared in the comedy-drama TV series Lipstick Jungle, and in the police procedural series Blue Bloods in 2013.

References

External links 

Rotten Tomatoes profile

1970 births
20th-century American actresses
21st-century American actresses
Living people
People from Winter Haven, Florida
Actresses from Florida
American stage actresses
American television actresses
American soap opera actresses
Queens University of Charlotte alumni
University of Florida alumni
Florida State University alumni
American violinists